The Dream of Saint Joseph is an oil-on-canvas painting created between 1628 and 1645 by the French Baroque painter Georges de La Tour which is now in the collection of the Musée d'Arts de Nantes.

The painting depicts Saint Joseph, the father of Jesus, being visited in a dream by an angel with a message. According to the New Testament he was actually visited four times with various messages and it is not clear in this case which visit is being portrayed. It is most likely to represent the second visit in which Joseph is advised to leave Bethlehem and seek sanctuary for the Holy Family in Egypt.

Typical of many of de La Tour's works, a chiaroscuro effect is achieved by lighting the scene with a candle.

See also
 Saint Joseph's dreams
 100 Great Paintings

References

1600s paintings
Paintings by Georges de La Tour
Religious paintings
Paintings of Saint Joseph
Angels in art